Dame Susan Hill, Lady Wells,  (born 5 February 1942) is an English author of fiction and non-fiction works. Her novels include The Woman in Black, The Mist in the Mirror, and I'm the King of the Castle, for which she received the Somerset Maugham Award in 1971.

She was appointed Commander of the Order of the British Empire (CBE) in the 2012 Birthday Honours and Dame Commander of the Order of the British Empire (DBE) in the 2020 Birthday Honours, both for services to literature.

Early life and education
Hill was born in Scarborough, North Yorkshire. Her home town was later referred to in her novel A Change for the Better (1969) and in some short stories like Cockles and Mussels.

She attended Scarborough Convent School, where she became interested in theatre and literature. Her family left Scarborough in 1958 and moved to Coventry where her father worked in car and aircraft factories. Hill states that she attended a girls' grammar school, Barr's Hill. Her fellow pupils included Jennifer Page, the first Chief Executive of the Millennium Dome. At Barrs Hill, she took A levels in English, French, History, and Latin, proceeding to an English degree at King's College London. By this time, she had already written her first novel, The Enclosure, which was published by Hutchinson in her first year at the university.

Her next novel Gentleman and Ladies was published in 1968 and was runner-up for the John Llewellyn Rhys Prize. This was followed in quick succession by A Change for the Better, I'm the King of the Castle, The Albatross and other stories, Strange Meeting, The Bird of Night, A Bit of Singing and Dancing and In the Springtime of the Year, all written and published between 1968 and 1974.

Personal life
Hill was engaged to David Lepine, organist at Coventry Cathedral, but he died of a coronary in 1972. In 1975, she married Shakespeare scholar Stanley Wells, and they moved to Stratford upon Avon. Their first daughter, author Jessica Ruston, was born in 1977, and their second daughter, Clemency, was born in 1985. A middle daughter, Imogen, was born prematurely, and died at the age of five weeks. In 2013, it was reported that she had left her husband and moved in with Barbara Machin, creator of Waking The Dead, who adapted Hill's crime fiction novels featuring detective Simon Serrailler and Hill's The Small Hand. However, she said that she was 'still married' to Wells in 2015. In 2016, Machin left Hill for comedian Rhona Cameron.

In the 1990s Hill founded her own publishing company, Long Barn Books, which has published two Simon Serrailler short stories and The Magic Apple Tree, all by Susan Hill, as well as The Dream Coat by Adele Geras, Colouring In by Angela Huth and Counting My Chickens by Deborah Devonshire.

Published works

Hill's novels are written in a descriptive gothic style, especially her ghost story The Woman in Black, which was published in 1983. She has expressed an interest in the traditional English ghost story, which relies on suspense and atmosphere to create its impact, similar to the classic ghost stories by Montague Rhodes James and Daphne du Maurier. The novel was turned into a play in 1987 and continues to run in the West End of London, joining the group of plays that have run for over twenty years. It was also made into a television film in 1989, and a film by Hammer Film Productions in 2012. She wrote another ghost story with similar ingredients, The Mist in the Mirror in 1992, and a sequel to du Maurier's Rebecca entitled Mrs de Winter in 1993.

In 2004, Hill began a series of crime novels featuring detective Simon Serrailler, entitled The Various Haunts of Men (2004). This was followed by The Pure in Heart (2005), The Risk of Darkness (2006), The Vows of Silence (2009), The Shadows in the Street (2010),  The Betrayal of Trust (2011), A Question of Identity (2013), The Soul of Discretion (2014) and A Breach of Security, a short story (2014), Hero, another short story (2016), The Comforts of Home in 2018 and The Benefit of Hindsight in October 2019.

Awards
 1971 Somerset Maugham Award   I'm the King of the Castle
 1972 Whitbread Novel Award   The Bird of Night (which was also shortlisted for the Booker Prize)
 1972 John Llewellyn Rhys Prize The Albatross
 1988 Nestlé Smarties Book Prize (Gold Award) (6–8 years category) Can It Be True?: A Christmas Story
 2012 CBE
 2020 DBE

References

External links
 
 
 
 A writer's life: Susan Hill from The Daily Telegraph
 Contemporary Literary Criticism : Susan Hill
 Radio Drama by Susan Hill

1942 births
Living people
Alumni of King's College London
Dames Commander of the Order of the British Empire
Fellows of King's College London
People from Scarborough, North Yorkshire
English fantasy writers
John Llewellyn Rhys Prize winners
British women short story writers
Ghost story writers
English lesbian writers
Women science fiction and fantasy writers
English women novelists
20th-century English novelists
20th-century English women writers
21st-century English novelists
21st-century English women writers
Women mystery writers
20th-century British short story writers
21st-century British short story writers
People educated at Barr's Hill School
Writers from Yorkshire
Wives of knights